High Crime is the seventh studio album by Al Jarreau, released in 1984. While slightly lower in the charts than his 1981 Breakin' Away and 1983 Jarreau release, this album scored in the top 10 on the Billboard Jazz charts and top 50 in the Billboard 200. In 1986 the album received a Grammy Award nomination for Best R&B Vocal Performance, Male. The album was certified Gold in 1986.

Reception
AllMusic gave the album the following review: "High Crime is fueled by the hard-pushing hit from Jarreau's previous album Boogie Down, producer Jay Graydon cranks up the energy level some more and comes up with a snazzy high-tech vehicle for his converted R&B singer. The sound is hotter, stoked by greater reliance upon synthesizers and electronically goosed rhythm tracks, and Jarreau's own vocals are more hectic, though again not much in the way of individuality is required of him. But the material this time isn't as strong—though 'Murphy's Law' is pretty catchy with its flugelhorn punctuations—and so the reluctance to exploit the unique vocal talents of Jarreau is more glaring. The minor hit single of the album, oddly, is the mundane ballad 'After All,' an ominous harbinger of bathos to come from Jarreau down the road."

Track listing

Charts

Personnel
 Al Jarreau – lead vocals (all tracks), arrangements (2, 5), backing vocals (3, 6, 9, 10)
 Jay Graydon – guitar (1, 2, 3, 5, 6, 8, 9, 10), arrangements (all tracks), synthesizers (2, 3, 4, 6, 10), computer concept (3)
 Paul Jackson Jr. – guitar (6, 8)
 Robbie Buchanan – synthesizers (1, 2, 4, 5, 9), arrangements (1, 5), electric piano (6)
 Gary Chang – Fairlight programming (2)
 Paul Bliss – computer concept (3), arrangements (3)
 Steve Kipner – computer concept (3), arrangements (3)
 Greg Phillinganes – synthesizers (4, 8, 10), arrangements (8)
 David Foster – electric piano (5), synthesizers (5), arrangements (5)
 Erich Bulling – Yamaha DX1 programming (5)
 Bobby Lyle – synthesizers (6), arrangements (6)
 Bo Tomlin – Yamaha DX1 programming (6, 10)
 Steve George – synthesizers (7), arrangements (7)
 Bob Beats – bass guitar (1)
 Nathan East – bass guitar (2, 10), arrangements (10)
 Jake Jugs – bass guitar (4)
 Skinsoh Umor – drums (1)
 Chip McSticks – drums (2)
 Mike Baird – percussion (2, 9), cymbals (4), drums (5)
 Tyrone B. Feedback – drums (4)
 O. Rapage – drums (7)
 Rug Toupé – drums (7)
 Pat Mastelotto – electronic drums (7)
 U. L. Blowby – drums (8)
 Champ Time – drums (9)
 Tubs Margranate – drums (10)
 Bill Reichenbach Jr. – trombone (2, 8)
 Charles Loper – trombone (2, 8)
 Chuck Findley – trumpet (2, 8)
 Gary Grant – trumpet (2, 8), flugelhorn (3)
 Jerry Hey – trumpet (2, 8), horn arrangements (2, 8), flugelhorn (3)
 Glen Ballard – arrangements (2)
 Clif Magness – arrangements (2)
 Jeremy Lubbock – arrangements (5)
 Richard Feldman – arrangements  (9)
 Marcel East – arrangements  (10) 
 Richard Page – backing vocals (3), arrangements (7)
 Bill Champlin – backing vocals (6, 8, 9), arrangements (9)
 Carmen Twillie – backing vocals (6, 8, 9)
 Siedah Garrett – backing vocals (8)

Production
 Producer – Jay Graydon
 Recorded by Ian Eales and Jay Graydon at Garden Rake Studios (Sherman Oaks, CA).
 Mixed by Jay Graydon at Garden Rake Studios; Ian Eales and Michael Verdick at Channel Recorders (Burbank, CA).
 Mastered by Steve Hall at Future Disc (Hollywood, CA).
 Album Coordinator – Shirley Klein
 Art Direction – Jeffrey Kent Ayefoff and Michael Hodgson
 Design – Michael Hodgson
 Photography – Just Loomis
 Lyrical and Poetic Consultant – Monica Dalsasso
 Management – Patrick Raines & Associates

References

Al Jarreau albums
1984 albums
Warner Records albums